= 

Ratua Satyendra Nath Bose Government Polytechnic, is a government polytechnic located in Ratua, Malda district, West Bengal.

About college
This polytechnic is affiliated to the West Bengal State Council of Technical Education,  and recognised by AICTE, New Delhi. This polytechnic offers diploma courses in Electrical  and Civil Engineering.

See also

References

External links
Official website WBSCTE

Universities and colleges in Malda district
Educational institutions established in 2014
2014 establishments in West Bengal
Technical universities and colleges in West Bengal